The Holms Water is a river and a tributary of the Biggar Water, which is a tributary of the River Tweed, in the parish of Broughton, Glenholm and Kilbucho in the Scottish Borders area of Scotland, near Glenkirk, Stanhope, Peeblesshire and Hearthstane.

See also

List of places in the Scottish Borders
List of places in Scotland
List of rivers of Scotland

External links
Glenlood Hill between Holms Water and Kingledoors Burn
Scottish Norders Council: A Borderlands Wetland Vision, final Report

Tributaries of the River Tweed
1Holms